Hibbertia pustulata is a species of flowering plant in the family Dilleniaceae and is endemic to the Blue Mountains area in New South Wales. It is a small, low-lying shrub with more or less glabrous foliage, more or less linear leaves, and yellow flowers usually arranged singly on the ends of stems, the flowers with four stamens on one side of two glabrous carpels.

Description
Flowering mainly occurs from August to October.

Taxonomy
Hibbertia pustulata was first formally described in 2012 by Hellmut R. Toelken in the Journal of the Adelaide Botanic Gardens from specimens collected in Leura in 2006. The specific epithet (pustulata) means "pustulate".

Distribution and habitat
This hibbertia grows in swampy heathland near creek lines and occurs in the Blue Mountains and Wollemi National Parks in central eastern New South Wales.

See also
List of Hibbertia species

References

pustulata
Flora of New South Wales
Plants described in 2012
Taxa named by Hellmut R. Toelken